The Peter B. Gustavson School of Business is a business school at the University of Victoria located in the municipality of Oak Bay, British Columbia. Originally the school was called the UVic Faculty of Business, but on October 22, 2010 the name was changed  when Peter B. Gustavson donated $10 million to the school.

On October 7, 2011, Sardul S. Gill gave a $5 million gift to the Gustavson School and the graduate school was renamed as the Sardul S. Gill Graduate School at the Gustavson School of Business.

The school provides bachelor, master's, MBA, Ph.D. and Executive Education programs. These include:
 Bachelor of Commerce (BCom)
 Master of Business Administration (MBA)
 Master of Global Business (MGB)
 Master of Management (MM)
 PhD in International Management & Organization
 Executive Programs

About

The institution was established in 1990.

Accreditation

The Gustavson School of Business is one of the seven business schools in Canada that is double-accredited by both AACSB and EQUIS, two of the international accreditations of management education.

The Peter B. Gustavson School was first awarded accreditation in February 2007 and has since maintained the EQUIS Quality label.

On December 17, 2010, Gustavson was awarded accreditation to the Association to Advance Collegiate Schools of Business.

History
 1982 – UVic's senate approves a proposal to establish a School of Business.
 1989 – Dr. J.A. Schofield is appointed acting director of the new School of Business.
 1990 - The business school was established as the UVic School of Commerce.
 1990 – The UVic School of Business officially launches a "3+1" format BCom program with 158 students, a co-operative education component and three specializations: entrepreneurship, international business and tourism/hospitality management. Dr. David Boag is appointed as the school's first director.
 1991 – The School of Business' appoints dedicated faculty members including Dr. Ali Dastmalchian, Dr. Ignace Ng, Dr. Dale Beckman and Dr. Peter Murphy. A board of advisers is established and chaired by Mr. David Black. The International Programs office is established and 71 students participate on exchange in North and Southeast Asia.
 1992 – The MBA program launches with an inaugural class of 32 candidates. The UVic School of Commerce welcomes its first class of incoming exchange students from National Sun Yat-sen University in Taiwan. The Commerce Students' Society is founded.
 1993 – The Commerce Students' Society creates the first Greater Victoria Business Banquet to connect the regional business community and future leaders.
 1994 – The School of Business celebrates its first convocation when 61 BCom students and 26 MBA students receive degrees.
 1995 – The university grants the School of Business faculty status and establishes a Faculty Business, with Dr. Roger Wolff as the first dean. While maintaining its official name for ceremonial purposes, the faculty re-brands itself as UVic Business.
 1997 – Construction ends and the Business and Economics Building, home of the Faculty Business, officially opens in September.
 1998 – The MBA program introduces Canada's first International Integrative Management Exercise (IIME).
 1999 – UVic Business' entrepreneurship specialization is recognized by the Academy of Management with an Innovation in Entrepreneurship Pedagogy Award. UVic Business hosts the National Conference on Youth Entrepreneurship with 500 delegates attending.
 2000 – UVic Business wins three awards: Model Undergraduate Entrepreneurship Program; Award for Excellence in Internationalization; and Outstanding Program in International Education Award.
 2001 – UVic Business is ranked Number 1 for entrepreneurship, international business and alumni satisfaction in Canadian Business magazine.
 2002 – Dr. Ali Dastmalchian is appointed Dean. The first two UVic Business alumni chapters are launched in Victoria and Vancouver. The hospitality and service management specialization receives a Teaching Innovation Award.
 2003 – Business Class, UVic Business' alumni magazine debuts. A Calgary alumni chapter is launched.
 2004 – The Distinguished Entrepreneur of the Year (DEYA) event is established, with Jeff Mallett, former COO of Yahoo! honoured as the inaugural recipient. Global alumni reaches 2,500 members and a Toronto alumni chapter is launched. The RBC Internal Case Competition is established for the BCom program.
 2005 – Comedian Nathan Fielder graduates with really good grades.
 2006 – The National Chair in Aboriginal Economic Development is established jointly with the UVic Faculty of Law. UVic Business signs its 50th exchange partnership agreement with the Norwegian School of Economics and Business.
 2007 – UVic Business receives EQUIS accreditation. The UVic Innovation Centre for Students is established.
 2008 – The Faculty of Business signs its first dual degree agreement with France's EDHEC Business School.
 2009 – The Faculty of Business receives UVic Senate approval to launch a new PhD program in International Management & Organization, accepting doctoral students for study in advanced business administration starting in 2010.
 2010 – UVic Business celebrates its 20th anniversary. UVic Business receives approval for the Master of Global Business degree and graduate certificate and diploma in entrepreneurship.
 March 19, 2010 – UVic Business receives a $10 million donation from Gustavson, FCA, BCom, CA and his family.
 October 22, 2010 – UVic Business becomes the Peter B. Gustavson School of Business.
 December 17, 2010 – Gustavson School of Business was awarded accreditation to the Association to Advance Collegiate Schools of Business or AACSB.
 October 7, 2011 – Sardul S. Gill donates $5 million to Gustavson and the school's graduate programs are renamed to become the Gill Graduate School at the Gustavson School of Business.
 July 1, 2012 - Dr. Saul Klein is appointed Dean.

Programs

The Gustavson School of Business offers the following programs:

Bachelor of Commerce (BCom)

Gustavson has a "2+2" program structure, meaning students take pre-commerce coursework and a number of required courses in the first two years of their degree. Required courses in these first 2 years include "Microeconomics", "Finite Mathematics", "Academic Reading & Writing", "Statistics for Business", and a choice of either "The Literature of Our Era", "Great Moments in English Literature" or "Technical Communications: Written and Verbal" along with 15 electives of your choice. Recommended electives include classes in entrepreneurship, sociology, digital humanities, philosophy, and more.

Gustavson does not use the traditional business curriculum and, instead, uses three fields of specialization: international business, service management and entrepreneurship. Gustavson is the only business school that teaches all specializations in an “integrative” manner with collaborative/team-based instruction.

One strategy to attract high achieving students at the Gustavson School of Business is the mandatory co-op mandate for all undergraduates.
 The business school has failed to acknowledge whether students are co-oping at companies of relevance.

Master of Business Administration (MBA)

The UVic MBA at the Gill Graduate School can be completed in either Daytime or Evening schedules. The Daytime program or Full-time MBA is 17 months in length with a specialization and a co-op term. During the specialization term, students have the option of either studying at an international partner institutions in more than 12 different countries or choose one of the two specializations at Gustavson. Each non-exchange student also participates in an international integrated management exercise (IIME), at which time the students travel to Asia, Europe or Latin America to experience doing business in a foreign country. Most of the same curriculum, with the exception of specialization, is covered in the Evening program, which is 24 months in length, with classes on one weekend in each month.

Master of Global Business (MGB)

The Master of Global Business (MGB) degree program offers those with undergraduate degrees in Commerce, Business Administration or Management, the opportunity to specialize in international business management and leadership at a graduate level.
 
The MGB program is primarily located at the University of Victoria campus in Victoria, BC, with components delivered by Gustavson faculty at overseas partner institutions in both Asia, at National Sun Yat-Sen University in Kaohsiung, Taiwan; and Europe, at Johannes Kepler University in Linz, Austria.

PhD in International Management and Organization

Executive programs

Research

The school has a number of specialized research centres that serve collaborative initiatives between faculty, students and the wider community such as government, industry, alumni and NGOs. These Centres serve to promote the research environment, and are homes for major research grants and projects.

Centres include:
 Centre for Sustainability and Social Innovation

Business Co-op and Career Centre

The Business Career Centre at Gustavson is a hub for career-related activities.

International Programs

Students participating in the exchange program spend one semester in their final year studying at one of 80+ partner universities in 34 countries learning the local language and business practices. At Gustavson, 80 per cent of undergraduate students participate in an international exchange.

Notable alumni 
 Nathan Fielder: started a not-for-profit company called Summit Ice Apparel
 Ryan Holmes
 Jeff Mallett

References

University of Victoria
Business schools in Canada